The following is a timeline of the history of the city of Baku, Azerbaijan.

Prior to 20th century

 12th century CE – Maiden Tower (Baku) built.
 1169 – Lezgi Mosque built.
 1378 – Juma Mosque built.
 1442 – Palatial mosque of Palace of the Shirvanshahs built.
 1509 – Persians in power.
 1578 – Ottomans in power.
 1603 – Persians in power again.
 1723 – Town taken by Russians.
 1732 – Oil refinery in operation.
 1735 – Persians in power again.
 1747 – Baku Khanate established.
 1806 – Town taken by Russian forces.
 1813 – Town becomes part of Russia per Gulistan Treaty.
 1817 – Cholera outbreak.
 1823 – Paraffin factory begins operating.
 1832 – "First secular Russian school" opens.
 1846 – Baku becomes part of the Shemakh province.
 1859
 Oil refineries begin operating on outskirts of town.
 Town becomes capital of the newly established Baku Governorate.
 1860 – Population: 13,381.
 1868
 Tbilisi-Baku telegraph begins operating.
 Fountains Square constructed.
 1875 – Ekinchi begins publication.
 1878 – Iosif Dzahkerli becomes mayor.
 1883 – Batum-Baku railway built.
 1884
  built.
 Oil Extractors Congress Council established.
 1886 – Population: 45,679.
 1887
 Baku Polytechnicum established.
 Armenian Saint Gregory the Illuminator's Church, Baku built.
 1897 – Population: 112,253.
 1900 – Population: 179,133.

20th century

 1901 – Synagogue built.
 1902 – Baku International Sea Trade Port opens.
 1903 – July: Labor strike.
 1904
 Balakhany and Bibi-Eibat Workers Organisation founded.
 City hall built.
 1905
 Armenian–Tatar massacre.
 Irshad newspaper begins publication.
 1907 – Batumi-Baku oil pipeline constructed.
 1909 – Baku Boulevard constructed.
 1910 – Phenomenon cinema built.
 1912 – Philharmonic Hall built.
 1913
 Ismailiyya building constructed.
 Population: 237,000.
 1914 – Taza Pir Mosque built.
 1917 – Iranian communist Edalat Party founded in Baku.
 1918
 March Days inter-ethnic conflict.
 September Days massacre of Armenians.
 Baku becomes capital of Azerbaijan Democratic Republic.
 1919
 Baku State University founded.
 Molodezh Azerbaijana newspaper begins publication.
 1920
 28 April: 11th Army (Soviet Union) takes city.
 Baku becomes capital of Azerbaijan Soviet Socialist Republic.
 Azerbaijan State Symphony Orchestra and Baku Polytechnic Institute founded.
 Azerbaijan State Academic Opera and Ballet Theater active.
 Kirov raion created.
 1922
 7 November: Avraamov's Symphony of Sirens performed.
 State Drama Theatre opens.
 1923
 National Library of Azerbaijan opens on Torgovaya.
 Baku Theatre Technical School founded.
 1925 – Baku Workers' and Peasants Theatre opens.
 1928 – Theatre of Young Spectators founded.
 1931 – Baku Puppet Theatre established.
 1939 – Population: 809,347 metro.
 1940 – Baku Museum of Education founded.
 1941 – Kishlinsky district created.
 1945 – Azerbaijan State Institute for the Arts active.
 1949 – Sumqayit developed near city.
 1951 – Stalin Stadium opens.
 1952 – Government House built.
 1965 – Population: 737,000 city; 1,137,000 urban agglomeration.
 1967
 Baku Metro begins operating.
 Azerbaijan Carpet Museum established.
 1979 – Population: 1,046,000.
 1985 – Population: 1,693,000 (estimate).
 1989
 Azadliq newspaper begins publication.
 Baku Islamic Madrasa established.
 1990
 January:
 Baku pogrom of Armenians.
 Black January.
 Sanan Alizade becomes mayor.
 1991
City becomes capital of Azerbaijan Republic.
 1993
Rafael Allahverdiyev becomes mayor.
 1994
 1994 Baku Metro bombings.
 Azerbaijan State Pantomime Theatre founded.
 1995
October: 1995 Baku Metro fire.
 2000 – 25 November: The 6.8  Baku earthquake affected the region.

21st century

 2001 – Hajibala Abutalybov becomes mayor.
 2005 – Center for Economic and Social Development established.
 2006
 Baku–Tbilisi–Ceyhan pipeline in operation.
 State Maritime Administration (Azerbaijan) headquartered in city.
 2008 
December: International Mugham Center of Azerbaijan opens.
 2009 – Uzeyir Hajibeyov International Music Festival begins.
 2010
 National Flag Square opens in Bayil.
 SOCAR Tower construction begins.
 2012
 Baku Crystal Hall built.
 Heydar Aliyev Center opens.
 May: Eurovision Song Contest 2012 held in city.
 Population: 2,122,300.
 2013 
Flame Towers opens.
2014
Lycée français de Bakou opened. Ilham Aliyev and his wife participated in the opening ceremony.
 2015
Baku National Stadium opens.
 March: Baku Olympic Stadium opens.
June: 2015 European Games held in city.

See also
 History of Baku
 Other names of Baku

References

This article incorporates information from the Azerbaijani Wikipedia and Russian Wikipedia.

Bibliography

Published in 19th century
 
 
 
 
 

Published in 20th century
 
 
 
 
 
 
 
 
  (Novel set in Baku)
 Alstadt, Audrey L. The Azerbaijani Bourgeoisie and the Cultural-Enlightenment Movement in Baku: First Steps Toward Nationalism. 1983
 Audrey Altstadt-Mirhadi, “Baku: Transformation of a Muslim Town,” in The City in Late Imperial Russia, ed. Michael F. Hamm (Bloomington: Indiana University Press, 1986)
 Altstadt, A., 'The Baku city duma: arena for elite conflict', Central Asian Survey, 5 (1986)

Published in 21st century

External links

 Digital Public Library of America. Items related to Baku, various dates

Baku
baku
Timeline
Years in Azerbaijan
Baku
History of Tats